Sayre is a small city in, and the county seat of, Beckham County, in western Oklahoma, United States. It is halfway between Oklahoma City, and Amarillo, Texas, on Interstate 40 and the former U.S. Route 66. The population was 4,375 at the 2010 census, the largest recorded by a census since Sayre's founding. The total was an increase of 6.3 percent from the 2000 census.

History
After the Civil War, Congress wanted to stimulate the economy and aid the growth of the nation. One way that they achieved this was to promote the building of the western railroads. Upon completion of the Union Pacific-Central Pacific joining together in 1869 with the Golden Spike, other railroads trying to capitalize on commerce and trade also began crossing the western country. This included the Great Northern and Burlington in the far north, and the Southern Pacific on the extreme southern border.

Eventually this would lead to rails crossing Indian Territory, present-day Oklahoma, around the start of the 20th century. A new rail line was extended from Weatherford to Texola by McCabe & Steen Contractors in July 1901. Entrepreneurs would buy land near where the new tracks were being laid, and also near a source of water. The Choctaw Town Site and Improvement Company did this, and when the Choctaw, Oklahoma and Gulf Railroad crossed the North Fork of the Red River in Western Indian Territory an instant town sprang up, which incorporated on 14 September 1901.

The Choctaw Townsite & Improvement Company began selling lots to new "Sooners" arriving to start a new life. The seeds of a new town were on, businessmen came to sell their wares to the new town folk, and within one year the town's population was up to around 1,000. Pennsylvanian Robert Heysham Sayre, a stockholder of the railroad, gave his name to the newly formed town in 1901.

The Chicago, Rock Island and Pacific Railway Company (called CRI&P), later just the "Rock Island", leased the new line. The Rock Island Line would complete its march to the Pacific by filling in the line to Tucumcari, New Mexico.

During the period of 1901–1907, Sayre was part of Roger Mills County in Oklahoma Territory. At the time Oklahoma became a state, Beckham County was created and Sayre, which was within the boundary of Beckham County, was named as the temporary county seat. An election in 1908 confirmed Sayre as the permanent seat, with voters preferring it to the town of Erick. The Beckham County Courthouse was completed in 1911, and is still in service over a century later. It is listed on the National Register of Historic Places.

The discovery of oil and gas nearby caused the population to boom between 1920 and 1930. In the 1930s U.S. Route 66, a dream forwarded by fellow Oklahoman Cyrus Avery, would come to Sayre, cementing the town's fate to fuel the cars and feed the people exploring the country.

In 1940 film director John Ford used Sayre's Beckham County Courthouse in the film The Grapes of Wrath, based on the famous book by John Steinbeck.

During the 1970s Sayre and the surrounding area benefited from the natural gas and oil development in the Panhandle-Hugoton field, the largest-volume gas field in the United States, and the world's largest known source of helium. Between 1973 and 1993 the field produced over 8 trillion cubic feet (230,000,000 m³) of gas.

Geography
Sayre is located at  (35.298940, -99.636556). The area is dominated by low rolling red clay hills.

Demographics

As of the census of 2000, there were 4,114 people, 1,132 households, and 678 families residing in the city.  The population density was 1,215.9 people per square mile (469.9/km).  There were 1,399 housing units at an average density of 413.5 per square mile (159.8/km).  The racial makeup of the city was 74.99% White, 18.25% African American, 2.53% Native American, 0.41% Asian, 1.92% from other races, and 1.90% from two or more races. Hispanic or Latino of any race were 5.35% of the population.

There were 1,132 households, out of which 26.7% had children under the age of 18 living with them, 45.8% were married couples living together, 10.6% had a female householder with no husband present, and 40.1% were non-families. 36.5% of all households were made up of individuals, and 18.9% had someone living alone who was 65 years of age or older.  The average household size was 2.20 and the average family size was 2.87.

In the city, the population was spread out, with 14.6% under the age of 18, 14.0% from 18 to 24, 40.9% from 25 to 44, 16.0% from 45 to 64, and 14.5% who were 65 years of age or older.  The median age was 35 years. For every 100 females, there were 197.0 males.  For every 100 females age 18 and over, there were 216.8 males.

The median income for a household in the city was $21,713, and the median income for a family was $30,000. Males had a median income of $22,167 versus $18,147 for females. The per capita income for the city was $10,378.  About 15.9% of families and 20.7% of the population were below the poverty line, including 26.1% of those under age 18 and 14.0% of those age 65 or over.

Economy
Sayre's economy has been based on agriculture and the production of oil and gas. By the 1930s, the town had five oil companies and one gasoline plant in operation. United Carbon Company built a carbon black plant there. Circa 2000 the Flying J truck stop opened on a  plot of land along Interstate 40 in Sayre;  it paid $150,000 in annual sales taxes and had 117 employees. The city government had purchased the land and sold it to the developer at cost in order to attract the development.

The North Fork Correctional Facility, a privately owned, medium-security prison opened in 1998. This prison had 270 employees as of 2001, and that year  Peter T. Kilborn of The New York Times wrote that the prison "is responsible for lifting Sayre's spirits and reigniting its economy." Circa 2003 the community experienced economic issues when prisoners from Wisconsin were recalled from the prison.

Education
Southwestern Oklahoma State University at Sayre or SWOSU@Sayre, is an accredited junior college serving western Oklahoma. It was founded in 1938 as Sayre Junior College and merged with SWOSU by an act of the Oklahoma Legislature in 1987.

Western Technology Center, Sayre campus provides the opportunity for adults and high school students to get occupationally-specific training. Sayre Public Schools is a member of the WTC district.

Sayre Public Schools is a school district serving the cities of Sayre and Elk City in Oklahoma. It includes the following schools:
 Sayre Elementary School
 Sayre Middle School
 Sayre High School

In 1994–5, the district was the defendant in a liability suit eventually decided by the Supreme Court of Oklahoma.

Government
Sayre has an aldermanic form of city government.

NRHP listings
 Beckham County Courthouse (NR 84002968)
 J. W. Danner House (NR 02000169)
 Sayre Champlin Service Station (NR 04000130)
 Sayre Rock Island Depot (also known as the Shortgrass Country Museum, NR 00000654)
 Sayre City Park (NR 04000127)
 Sayre Downtown Historic District (NR 02000972)

Notable people
 Maxie Anderson, hot air balloonist, member of the first crew to cross the Atlantic Ocean in a balloon
 Leo Meyer, served as mayor of Sayre from 1905-1906. He moved to Guthrie in 1907 when he was chosen as the new state's first assistant Secretary of State.

References

External links
 Sayre -- Encyclopedia of Oklahoma History and Culture
 Sayre, Oklahoma Government Website
 Sayre Public Schools

Cities in Beckham County, Oklahoma
Cities in Oklahoma
County seats in Oklahoma
Populated places established in 1901